Tye Ruotolo (born January 22, 2003) is an American submission grappler and black belt Brazilian jiu-jitsu athlete. A competitor with his twin brother Kade since the age of 3, Ruotolo is a IBJJF World champion at brown belt level. At the 2019 ADCC World Championship, Ruotolo as a 16-year-old was the youngest competitor to participate in the competition and also to reach the semi-finals where he eventually came fourth place. Following promotion to black belt in December 2021, Ruotolo became a two division Who's Number One (WNO) champion, a silver medalist at the 2022 World Jiu-Jitsu Championship and a bronze medalist at the 2022 ADCC World Championship.

Ruotolo is currently signed to ONE Championship.

Background 
Born in Maui, Hawaii, of Italian and Puerto Rican heritage, Ruotolo was raised in Huntington Beach, California, and began competing in jiujitsu at age 3. Ruotolo and his twin brother Kade were considered "grappling's first child-stars" and earned a sponsorship with RVCA at the age of 10. They trained at the Art Of Jiu-Jitsu academy (AOJ) for 4 years under Guilherme and Rafael Mendes before switching to Atos jiu-jitsu in 2017, a team to which AOJ was affiliated.

Grappling career 
In 2019, Ruotolo who was a 16-year-old blue belt, participated in the 2019 ADCC World Championship in the Lightweight division making him the youngest competitor in history at the time. He defeated Bruno Frazatto and Pablo Mantovani before losing to Kennedy Maciel in the semi-final. He faced Paulo Miyao in the Bronze medal match and lost on points. Ruotolo caught Miyao in a kneebar but refused to tap which has resulted in Miyao's knee suffering long term damage.

Both Ruotolo and his brother Kade were promoted to brown belts in BJJ by André Galvão in October 2020.

In September 2021, Ruotolo became WNO 185 lb champion by defeating Johnny Tama, Dante Leon and Micael Galvão. 

In the 2021 IBJJF World Jiu-Jitsu Championship, Ruotolo faced his brother, Kade in the finals of Brown Belt Lightweight division. Ruotolo submitted Kade by armbar. Shortly after this, both of them were promoted to black belt on December 14, 2021, by André Galvão.

In January 2022, Ruotolo became a two division WNO champion after winning the WNO 170 lb championship by submitting Levi Jones by kneebar.

On May 20, 2022, Ruotolo faced Garry Tonon at ONE 157 for his submission grappling debut in the promotion. He submitted Tonon by D'Arce choke in 97 seconds. This win earned Ruotolo his first Performance of the Night bonus award.

In the 2022 IBJJF World Jiu-Jitsu Championship, Ruotolo earned a silver medal in the Black Belt Lightweight division after losing to Micael Galvão in the finals on points.

In the 2022 ADCC World Championship, Ruotolo competed in the Absolute division against heavier opponents where he defeated Pedro Marinho and Felipe Pena before losing to Nicholas Meregali in a judge decision. Ruotolo obtained a bronze medal after Cyborg Abreu medically forfeited the bronze medal match.

On December 23, 2022, Ruotolo faced former ONE Featherweight World Champion, Marat Gafurov in a submission grappling catchweight bout of 180lbs at ONE on Prime Video 5. Ruotolo summitted Gafurov by triangle armbar. This win earned Ruotolo his second Performance of the Night bonus award.

Ruotolo is scheduled to face Reinier de Ridder on May 5, 2023, at ONE Fight Night 10.

Brazilian Jiu-Jitsu competitive summary 
Main Achievements:

 2 x WNO Champion (170 lb & 185 lb)
 2nd Place IBJJF World Championship (2022)
 2nd place 3QG Kumite 5 GP (2020)
 3rd place ADCC World Championship (2022)
 4th place ADCC World Championship (2019)

Main Achievements (Juvenile + Colored belts):

 IBJJF World Champion (2019, 2021 brown belt)
 IBJJF European Champion (2019)
 2nd place IBJJF European Championship (2019)

Instructor lineage 
Mitsuyo "Count Koma" Maeda → Carlos Gracie, Sr. → Helio Gracie → Rolls Gracie → Romero "Jacare" Cavalcanti → Alexandre Paiva → Fernando "Tererê" Augusto →  André Galvao → Tye Ruotolo

Notes

References 

Living people
2003 births
American practitioners of Brazilian jiu-jitsu
People awarded a black belt in Brazilian jiu-jitsu
People from Maui
American submission wrestlers